The Blytheville Giants, based in Blytheville, Arkansas played in the Northeast Arkansas League in 1937 and 1938 as an affiliate of the New York Giants. They won the league title both years with a 62–45 record in 1937 and 70–35 record in 1938.

Previously a Blytheville team played in the same league in 1910–1911 and the Blytheville Tigers played in the Tri-State League in 1925 and 1926.

Notable players

 Harry Feldman (1919–1962), pitcher

References

External links
Baseball Reference

Baseball teams established in 1910
Sports clubs disestablished in 1938
Professional baseball teams in Arkansas
Defunct Northeast Arkansas League teams
Defunct Tri-State League teams
New York Giants minor league affiliates
1910 establishments in Arkansas
1938 disestablishments in Arkansas
Blytheville, Arkansas
Defunct baseball teams in Arkansas
Baseball teams disestablished in 1938
Northeast Arkansas League teams